Events from the year 2010 in Macau, China.

Incumbents
 Chief Executive - Fernando Chui
 President of the Legislative Assembly - Lau Cheok Va

Events

January
 16 January - The opening of new building of Liaison Office of the Central People's Government in the Macao Special Administrative Region in Sé.

March
 28 March - Viva Macau ceased from operation.

May
 1 May - 2010 Macau labour protest

June
 19–20 June - 2010 East Asian Judo Championships at Tap Seac Multi-sports Pavilion.
 20 June - 2010 Hong Kong–Macau Interport at Macau Stadium.
 29 June - The  Mandarin Oriental, Macau at One Central opens.

September
 15 September - The premier of The House of Dancing Water.
 16 September - The inauguration of new road access to Coloane A Power Station.

December
 20 December - 2010 Macau transfer of sovereignty anniversary protest

References

 
Years of the 21st century in Macau
Macau
Macau
2010s in Macau